The 8mm Bergman-Simplex cartridge, also known as 8mm Bergmann Nº 6 and 8x18mm Simplex, is a cartridge developed by Theodor Bergmann for his Simplex pistols. Original loadings of this cartridge fired a 71 grain bullet at 790 feet per second.

References

Pistol and rifle cartridges